The 2015 Women's LEN Super Cup was a water polo match organized by LEN and contested by the reigning champions of the two main European club competitions, the 2014–15 LEN Women's Champions' Cup and the 2014-15 Women's LEN Trophy.

The match between Greek team Olympiacos and Italian CS Plebiscito Padova was played on 20 November 2015 in Athens, in the Papastrateio Hall in Piraeus, the home turf of Olympiacos. They defeated Padova 10-6.

Squads
The members of the two squads were as follows.

Olympiacos SFP

Plebiscito Padova

References

Women's LEN Super Cup
2015 in water polo